Vabre is a commune in the Tarn department in southern France.

Geography
The village lies on the left bank of the Gijou, which flows southwestward through the southern part of the commune, then flows into the Agout.

Population

See also
Communes of the Tarn department

References

Communes of Tarn (department)
Tarn communes articles needing translation from French Wikipedia